Marta Corredera Rueda (born 8 August 1991) is a Spanish professional footballer who plays as a winger or right wing-back for Primera División club Real Madrid CF and the Spain women's national team.

Rueda formerly represented FC Barcelona, Arsenal Ladies of the English FA WSL, Atlético de Madrid and Levante. She is a member of the Spain women's national football team and was part of the squad at the 2015 FIFA Women's World Cup in Canada as well as the 2019 FIFA Women's World Cup in France.

Club career
Corredera signed for Arsenal in July 2015, from Barcelona where she had won four consecutive Primera División titles since 2011. With the Gunners Corredera won the 2015 WSL Cup and the 2016 FA Women's Cup. In October 2016, Corredera and her compatriots Natalia Pablos and Vicky Losada all left Arsenal. She agreed a transfer to Atlético de Madrid where she won the 2017 league title.

Career statistics
Scores and results list Spain's and Catalonia's goal tally first, score column indicates score after each Corredera goal.

Honours
Espanyol
 Copa de la Reina de Fútbol: 2009, 2010

Barcelona
 Primera División: 2011–12, 2012–13, 2013–14, 2014–15
 Copa de la Reina de Fútbol: 2011, 2013, 2014

Arsenal
 FA Women's Cup: 2015–16
 FA WSL Cup: 2015

Atletico Madrid
 Primera División: 2016–17, 2017–18

Spain
 Algarve Cup: 2017
 Cyprus Cup: 2018

Individual
Catalan Female Player of the Year: 2014
Spanish Female Player of the Year: 2015

References

External links

 
 
 
 Profile at FC Barcelona

1991 births
Living people
Footballers from Terrassa
Spanish women's footballers
Spain women's international footballers
Primera División (women) players
FC Barcelona Femení players
RCD Espanyol Femenino players
Atlético Madrid Femenino players
Women's association football midfielders
Women's association football forwards
2015 FIFA Women's World Cup players
Arsenal W.F.C. players
Expatriate women's footballers in England
Women's Super League players
2019 FIFA Women's World Cup players
Real Madrid Femenino players
Levante UD Femenino players
Sportswomen from Catalonia
Spanish expatriate women's footballers
Spanish expatriate sportspeople in England
UEFA Women's Euro 2017 players